The Velveteen Age is an EP released by Diane Birch with the Phenomenal Handclap Band.  It consists of covers of songs she enjoyed while growing up. Birch and the band re-imagined the dark eighties and nineties music with exuberance instead of melancholy, giving them the feel of seventies pop. The picture on the cover is Birch at age 16, wearing a vintage Victorian wedding dress.

Track listing

References

External links 
 Diane Birch (official site)

2010 EPs
Diane Birch albums
S-Curve Records albums
Covers EPs